These are the late night Monday-Friday schedules on all three networks for each calendar season beginning September 1962. All times are Eastern and Pacific.

Talk shows are highlighted in yellow, local programming is white.

Schedule

Johnny Carson becomes the host of The Tonight Show on October 1, 1962.

By network

ABC

Returning Series
ABC News Final

NBC

New Series
The Tonight Show Starring Johnny Carson

Not returning from 1961-62
The Jack Paar Show
The Best Of Paar
The Tonight Show

United States late night network television schedules
1962 in American television
1963 in American television